Max Johnson (born July 25, 2001) is an  American football quarterback for the Texas A&M Aggies. Johnson attended and played high school football at Oconee County High School in Watkinsville, Georgia and began his college career at LSU before transferring to Texas A&M in 2022.

Early years
Johnson grew up in Athens, Georgia and attended Oconee County High School. As a senior, he threw for 2,143 yards, 30 touchdowns and five interceptions and was named the Georgia 4A Offensive Player of the Year. Johnson was rated a four-star recruit and committed to play college football at Louisiana State over an offer from Miami, coached by his uncle Mark Richt, as well as offers from Florida State, Georgia, Tennessee and South Carolina.

College career

LSU

Freshman season

Johnson started his freshman season as the team's third string quarterback before being named the team's starter before LSU's game against Florida. In his first career start, he threw for 239 yards and three touchdowns in a 37–34 upset victory over the sixth-ranked Gators and was named the Southeastern Conference Offensive Player of the Week for his performance. The following game, Johnson passed for an LSU freshman record 435 yards with three touchdowns and an interception while also rushing for 45 yards and two touchdowns in a 53–48 win over Ole Miss. In his first season at LSU, Johnson completed 88 out of 150 attempted passes for 1,069 passing yards, 8 touchdowns and one interception.

Sophomore season

Johnson was named LSU's starting quarterback during preseason training camp following an injury to Myles Brennan. In his sophomore and final season at LSU, Johnson completed 225 out of 373 attempted passes for 2,814 passing yards, 27 touchdowns and 6 interceptions.

On December 7, 2021, Johnson announced via social media that he would be leaving LSU to enter the transfer portal.

Texas A&M
On December 17, 2021, Johnson announced he would transfer to Texas A&M.

Statistics

Personal life
Johnson is the son of Pro Bowl and Super Bowl quarterback Brad Johnson and the nephew of former Georgia and Miami head coach Mark Richt.

References

External links
LSU Tigers bio

2001 births
Living people
American football quarterbacks
LSU Tigers football players
Texas A&M Aggies football players
Players of American football from Georgia (U.S. state)
Sportspeople from Athens, Georgia